Harald Bathelt is a German-Canadian geographer, currently a Canada Research Chair at University of Toronto.

References

External links
 

Academic staff of the University of Toronto
Canadian geographers
German geographers
Economic geographers
1960 births
Living people
Canada Research Chairs